The third HMS Black Joke was probably built in Baltimore in 1824, becoming the Brazilian slave ship Henriquetta. The Royal Navy captured her in September 1827 and purchased her into the service. The Navy re-named her Black Joke, after an English song of the same name, and assigned her to the West Africa Squadron (or Preventive Squadron). Her role was to chase down slave ships, and over her five-year career she freed thousands of slaves. The Navy deliberately burnt her in May 1832 because her timbers had rotted to the point that she was no longer fit for active service.

Henriquetta – slaver
Built as a Baltimore clipper (possibly as the vessel Griffen), Henriquetta (also Henri Quatre) was a brig designed to be fast.

HMS Sybille captured her on 6 September 1827. Commodore Francis Collier of Sybille wrote to the Admiralty noting that at the time of her capture Henriquetta was 257 tons, mounted three guns and had a crew of 38 men. She had 569 enslaved Africans on board "and had landed at Bahia 3,360 slaves in the last two years".

She was sold at auction in Sierra Leone on 5 January 1828, for £330 (approximately £ in ).

Black Joke – slaver catcher

The Navy took her into service as a tender to Sybille, under the command of Lieutenant William Turner of Sybille. During her service with the Navy, Black Jokes crew included an assistant surgeon, three midshipmen, thirty seamen and five marines as well as a number of Liberian Kroomen for use on detached boat service. Her armament consisted of one long 18-pounder on a pivot mount.

On 5 January 1828 she sailed with Sybille and the 20-gun post ship . On 12 January she captured the Spanish schooner Gertrudes (or Gertrudis), which carried 155 slaves. Gertrudes had outrun the other two British warships, but not Black Joke.

On 2 April a Spanish 14-gun brig fired on Black Joke as she approached the brig. After two hours of exchanging shots, and after suffering several casualties, the brig hoisted a flag of truce. She turned out to be the Providentia, of 14 guns and a crew of 80 men. She had fired on the Black Joke as Providentias captain had been warned that a Colombian privateer answering to the same description as Black Joke was in the area. Turner therefore released her. Black Joke suffered no casualties; Providentia had numerous of her crew killed and wounded.

On 1 May 1828 Black Joke fought the large and well-armed pirate Presidenté from Buenos Aires.  After two hours of action, and following the death of their captain and two others, as well as the wounding of a number more, the crew of the Presidenté sought a truce.  (Black Joke sustained one killed and a number wounded.)  The crew of Presidenté underwent an examination before being committed for trial on charges of piracy.  Many of her crew appeared to be British or have anglicized names, and they were sent back to England for trial. The next day Black Joke retook the Portuguese vessel Hosse, which Presidenté had taken as a prize. Presidente was lost at sea on her way to Sierra Leone but Black Joke earned salvage money for Hosse.

On 16 May, Black Joke captured Vengador. She had a crew of 45 men and eight guns but offered no resistance. She carried 645 slaves, the most ever captured on a single ship.

On 14 September Black Joke was in company with  when Primrose captured the Zephirina or Zephorina. Zephorina was carrying 218 slaves.

On 14 November Turner received promotion to commander. He turned over command of Black Joke to Lieutenant Henry Downes of Sybille. In November of the same year Black Joke was forced to leave the coast of Bioko (Fernando Po), due to fever on board.

In January 1829 Black Joke saw a Spanish brig as the Spaniard loaded slaves and set sail for Havana. Black Joke chased the Spaniard for 31 hours and on 1 February, when the wind dropped, resorted to sweeps to bring herself within gunshot of her prey. El Almirante mounted a total of 14 guns (ten Gover's 18-pounder cannon and four long 9-pounders) and had a crew of 80 men. Black Joke was almost half the size of El Almirante and mounted two guns. Good ship-handling, the discipline of the Royal Navy gun crew, and light winds gave Lieutenant Downes the advantage. In 80 minutes he defeated and captured the slaver, which  suffered 15 dead, including the captain and the first and second mates, and a further 13 wounded, while Black Joke suffered six wounded, two of whom died later. El Almirante held 466 slaves, who were later landed.

On 6 March Black Joke captured the 2-gun brigantine Carolina, which carried 420 slaves. After this capture Downes was invalided home because of illness, and received a promotion to Commander on his return in recognition of the capture of El Almirante. He had freed a total of 875 slaves.

Black Joke then came under the command of Lieutenant E.J. Parrey.  On 11 October he captured the Christina (or Cristina), a Spanish schooner of three guns and 24 crew members. She was carrying 354 slaves. Lieutenant William Coyde replaced Parrey, and on 1 April 1830 captured the Spanish brigantine Manzanares of three guns and 34 crew. Manzanares was carrying 354 slaves.

Later that month Black Joke was in refit in Sierra Leone. Coyde's replacement in Black Joke was Lieutenant William Ramsay.

On 9 November she captured Dos Amigos, a Baltimore schooner with a crew of 34 and armed with a single carronade; Dos Amigos had 567 African captives aboard, but may have relanded them before her capture. The Admiralty put Dos Amigos up for auction where the commodore of the British Anti-Slavery Squadron, Jonathan Hayes, bought her and named her .

On 21 or 22 February 1831 Black Joke captured a slaver with 300 slaves on board. This was probably the Spanish schooner Primeira.

In a famous action on 25 or 26 April 1831, Black Joke was again under Ramsey's command when she captured the Marinerito. Black Joke captured the much larger and more heavily armed Spanish slaver off the island of Bioko. At one point, 15-year-old Midshipman Hinde had to bring Black Joke back alongside Marinerito to rescue the boarding party, including Ramsey, which had become stranded on the Spanish slaver's deck. His rescue effort cost Hinde a bite from an angry parrot. Marinerito had 15 of her crew killed; Black Joke lost one man killed and four wounded, one of whom was Ramsey. Of the 496 slaves on Marinerito, 26 were found to have died and 107 were in so weakened a state that they were landed on Bioko, where more than half subsequently died. The remainder were taken to freedom in Sierra Leone.

In September, in company with Fair Rosamond, Black Joke chased two Spanish slavers into the Bonny River.  Lieutenant Ramsey, reported that "during the chase they were seen to throw their slaves overboard, by twos shackled together by the ankles, and left in this manner to sink or swim." Fair Rosamond captured the Spanish vessels, Regulo and Rapido, on 10 September and took them to Sierra Leone, where the Admiralty Court condemned them.  Black Joke freed 39 slaves, for which a half bounty was paid to the captain and crew.  A further bounty was paid for the 29 slaves who died between the capture and the condemnation of the Regulo.

Ramsey received promotion to the rank of commander for the capture of Marinerito and handed over command to Lieutenant H V Huntley. On 15 February 1832, Black Joke captured Spanish schooner Frasquita, alias Centilla, which was armed with two guns and had a crew of 31 men. Frasquitta yielded bounty money for the 290 slaves on board her.

In all, between November 1830 and March 1832, Black Joke and Fair Rosamond accounted for 11 out of the squadron's take of 13 slavers.

Fate
A survey held on the Black Joke in 1832 stated that her timbers were rotten, and that "she is not, in our opinion, a vessel calculated fit for H.M. Service."  There were discussions about further use of Black Joke, including use as a government vessel for Sierra Leone. She was due to be transferred to the governor when the rear admiral changed his mind and ordered that Black Joke be destroyed. She was burnt on 3 May 1832 and her stores sold.  The surveyors attached examples of her timber; all that now remains of the famous slave-chaser is an envelope filled with brown dust in The National Archives. In 1958 "a small quantity of the 'testings' of the timber of Black Joke were sent to Lagos for exhibition in the museum there".

When the Royal Navy ordered that Black Joke be burned, Peter Leonard, surgeon of HMS Dryad, wrote that she was the ship "which has done more towards putting an end to the vile traffic in slaves than all the ships of the station put together."

Notes

Citations

References

 
 
 
 
 
 
 

Brigs of the Royal Navy
African slave trade
Ships of the West Africa Squadron
Ships built in Baltimore
Merchant ships of Brazil
Slave ships
Captured ships
Brigs
1827 ships
Liberian-American history
Sierra Leonean-American history
Slavery in Brazil